St. Andrew's United Church is an historic congregation of the United Church of Canada in Toronto, Ontario, Canada. Located in the city's downtown core near the intersection of Yonge and Bloor it is a combination of five other downtown Toronto congregations. The church originated from St. Andrew's Church, founded in 1830 as the first Church of Scotland congregation in what was then the town of York. The original St. Andrew's was located at the corner of Adelaide and Church Streets. By the 1870s it had become clear that a new church was needed. The downtown core had moved westward, and most of the congregation wanted to shift in that direction as well, but a minority staunchly opposed the idea. With the congregation thus split, the majority moved to a new structure at King and Simcoe in 1876 that still exists today as St. Andrew's Church.

The smaller part of the congregation stayed in the eastern part of town and became known as "Old St. Andrew's" and this church gave rise to the current St. Andrew's United. In 1878 the Old St. Andrew's congregation built a new church at the corner of Jarvis and Carlton Streets. With the formation of the United Church of Canada in 1925 Old St. Andrew's elected to join the new union, while St. Andrew's on King remained Presbyterian.

Over the next decades the number of United Church supporters in the downtown area decreased dramatically and a number of congregations were consolidated. St. Andrew's is today the descendant of four other congregations. Westminster-Central United merged with St. Andrew's in 1950. The name was established as St. Andrew's, but the congregation left the Church Street building and moved to the location of Westminster-Central which was on Bloor near Yonge. The Church Street building was sold to two Baltic Lutheran congregations, which were then quickly increasing in number in Toronto. They kept the St. Andrew name and continue to operate as St. Andrew's Evangelical Lutheran Church.

Westminster-Central was itself the combination of three historic Toronto churches. Westminster Presbyterian was the first established on the site in 1891. It merged with Grosvenor Street Presbyterian in 1921 when the latter church's building was demolished as part of a plan to extend Bay Street. When the United Church was formed, Westminster then merged with Central Methodist Church, which was located just across the street. This created Westminster-Central, which continued until the merger with St. Andrew's in 1950. The final merger was with Yonge Street United Church in 1973, which was originally located at Yonge and Summerhill, but was destroyed by fire in May 1971.

The Westminster building that was the home of St. Andrew's after 1950 had been built in 1923, after the original 1891 structure on the site was destroyed by fire in 1920. In the mid-1970s great debate arose in the congregation about the state of the church. It was low on funds, but sitting on some of the most expensive real estate in Canada. After considerable discussion it was decided to demolish the old church, build an office tower above, and relocate the congregation to the lower level of the new complex. The redevelopment was completed in 1981, although the design of the final project had changed considerably.

The existing church at 117 Bloor Street East is a separate building facing Bloor St. and is set back into the urban courtyard, St. Andrew's Square. It is adjacent to the office tower, 121 Bloor St. East. A portion of the old church was retained by the city of Toronto and is now located further south on Yonge Street marking the entrance to McGill Street. Several other United Churches chose the same path in this period such as College Street United Church and Parkdale United Church.

Past buildings
The past buildings that housed St. Andrew's and the other congregations that have merged to create it:

See also
List of United Church of Canada churches in Toronto

References

"There’s a stone archway on the east side of Yonge, north of Gerrard" Toronto Life.

External links

United Church of Canada churches in Toronto
Church of Scotland churches in Scotland
1830 establishments in Upper Canada
Religious organizations established in 1830